The 2019 Big South Conference women's soccer tournament was the postseason women's soccer tournament for the Big South Conference held from November 1 through November 10, 2019. The quarterfinals of the tournament were held at campus sites, while the semifinals and final took place at Sportsplex at Matthews in Matthews, North Carolina. The eight-team single-elimination tournament consisted of three rounds based on seeding from regular season conference play. Radford were the defending champions, and successfully defended their championship with a 2–1 win over Gardner-Webb fin the final.  The conference tournament title was the seventh for the Radford women's soccer program and the seventh for head coach Ben Sohrabi.

Bracket

Source:

Schedule

Quarterfinals

Semifinals

Final

Statistics

Goalscorers 
3 Goals
 Nelia Perez (Radford)

2 Goals
 Alexa Genas (Campbell)
 Jada Newton (Gardner-Webb)

1 Goal
 Jessica Donald (Campbell)
 Alisha Holcombe (Gardner-Webb)
 Morgan Hutchison (Presbyterian)
 Alexeis Kirons (Radford)
 Stina Kleppe (Gardner-Webb)
 Emilie Kupsov (Longwood)
 Kori Lawrence (Presbyterian)
 Kyle Levesque (High Point)
 Lily McLane (Radford)
 Elyssa Nowowieski (Campbell)
 Brianna Oliver (Radford)
 Rosie O'Neal (Campbell)
 Gabi Paupst (Radford)
 Allie Thomas (Winthrop)
 Kayla Thomas (Radford)
 Kiersten Yuhas (Longwood)

All-Tournament team

Source:

MVP in bold

See also 
 Big South Conference
 2019 NCAA Division I women's soccer season
 2019 NCAA Division I Women's Soccer Tournament

References 

2019 Big South Conference women's soccer season
Big South Conference Women's Soccer Tournament